Oxford–Crown Historic District is a historic district roughly bounded by Chatham, Congress, Crown, Pleasant, Oxford Streets and Oxford Place in Worcester, Massachusetts.

The district contains Mid 19th Century Revival, Greek Revival, and Renaissance architecture. The area was added to the National Register of Historic Places in 1976, and expanded in 1980.

Due to its proximity to the city's downtown and the assemblage of historically significant properties, the Crown Hill Neighborhood Association gathered to petition City Council to form a Local Historic District in 2008.  In October 2010, the Crown Hill Survey Project commenced and in February 2011 the boundaries were created with the help of the neighborhood's property owners.  Approval was granted by the Worcester Historical Commission two years after efforts began.

See also
National Register of Historic Places listings in northwestern Worcester, Massachusetts
National Register of Historic Places listings in Worcester County, Massachusetts

References

Georgian architecture in Massachusetts
Renaissance Revival architecture in Massachusetts
Historic districts in Worcester, Massachusetts
National Register of Historic Places in Worcester, Massachusetts
Historic districts on the National Register of Historic Places in Massachusetts